Alexander Penna (born 15 June 1974) is a Brazilian cross-country skier. He competed in the men's 50 kilometre classical event at the 2002 Winter Olympics.

References

External links
 

1974 births
Living people
Brazilian male cross-country skiers
Olympic cross-country skiers of Brazil
Cross-country skiers at the 2002 Winter Olympics
Sportspeople from Philadelphia
21st-century Brazilian people